David Drew (30 March 1919 – 12 May 1976) was a South African cricket umpire. He stood in three Test matches between 1950 and 1954.

See also
 List of Test cricket umpires

References

1919 births
1976 deaths
Cricketers from Durban
South African Test cricket umpires